Peter Wesley Williams (born 17 May 1960) is a Welsh former professional footballer who played as a forward. He made appearances in the English Football League for Wrexham. He also played for Bangor City.

References

1960 births
Living people
People from Hawarden
Sportspeople from Flintshire
Welsh footballers
Association football forwards
Wrexham A.F.C. players
Bangor City F.C. players
English Football League players